The Garfield-Broad Apartments is a historic building in the Olde Towne East neighborhood of Columbus, Ohio. It was built in 1929 and added to the National Register of Historic Places in 1986.

The three-story building was designed as a luxury apartment complex of 49 units, within easy commuting distance of Downtown Columbus. The building is significant as a remaining early 20th century apartment building on East Broad Street, and for its Jacobethan Revival architecture. It features decorative brickwork, stucco, and half-timbering, along with elaborate stone decorations.

See also
 National Register of Historic Places listings in Columbus, Ohio

References

1929 establishments in Ohio
Apartment buildings in Ohio
Residential buildings completed in 1929
Residential buildings on the National Register of Historic Places in Ohio
National Register of Historic Places in Columbus, Ohio
Broad Street (Columbus, Ohio)